The Krazy Kong Album is a 1980 album by Wild Willy Barrett and released on his own Red Eye Records. The songs are a collection of recordings made over a decade and are available here for the first time. The album is notable for being the first white reggae album recorded, years before Regatta de Blanc, with the title track as a prime example. 'Kong and the Soup Dragon' is a nod to the Clangers with whistles featured throughout.

History 

In 1973 Barrett was signed up to the Transatlantic record label and was featured on Guitar Workshop, a label sampler. Transatlantic had shown no big interest in Barrett until he visited their offices with the 'Krazy Kong' demo. After the label commissioned an album of Kong, and Barrett wrote 'Return of Kong' and 'Kong and the Soup Dragon', he entered the studio in July and recorded these plus three folk songs. However some of the songs were quite pastiche, namely I'm A Dog, and the tapes were shelved. In 1977 Barrett enjoyed a No. 27 chart flop with Otway and this reignited interest in Barrett; he recorded Call of the Wild in 1979, his last with Polydor. One year later and Barrett unshelves the tapes and, together with a recently recorded A-Side, mixes and releases the Krazy Kong Album.

The album and accompanying single "A Shot of Red Eye" were released during the Tent Tour.

The Kongcept 

The three Kong songs are actually a story with definitive parts and musical accompaniment.

The first; 'Krazy Kong', is played over a heavy jungle beat with a reggae back-beat. In this part Barrett begins the story and explains that Kong is somewhat of a newbie to the town and is known as a live-wire who is dodged by men, however young women have a penchant for him.

'Return of Kong' sees Kong seeking Barrett, who he meets whilst taking a late night walk. Barrett heads on home and, panicking, hears the door knock, he invites Kong in and strikes up a friendship. 'Return of Kong' is New Wave with a lighter reggae beat.

In 'Kong and the Soup Dragon' it is revealed that Kong is a successful man, has a big house and employs a Butler, Footman and Chambermaid. Kong has a space machine that he takes off with, thus leaving the earth and visiting what is assumed to be the Clangers' planet. The song is a pastiche of a children's TV theme with whistling and comic sound effects.

The character of Kong is a simple monkey-like creature who smokes cigars, is escorted by women whilst partying on a Friday and plays saxophone. He is quite volatile and talks in this 'Kong scat' which Barrett soon learns. Kong also owns a mansion and a spacemobile.

Recording 

The bulk of the album was recorded at Pro Musica Studios in Maidenhead July 1973. Transatlantic sent Willy in the studio with Tony Atkins, a fellow producer, but he and Barrett didn't see eye to eye. The demo of Krazy Kong had an epic saxophone solo by Coxhill but the version on the Krazy Kong single is apparently only half of the demo. Also recorded at Pro Musica were the rocker Can't See the Trees, a Mike Sammesesque version of Bluey Green, an alternative version of Return of Kong and Nice To Know You're My Friend. The latter two songs were released as a 7" after the success of Really Free. Drink To Me Only and One Leg Blues were performed live at Hinckley College in Oxford and A Shot of Redeye was recorded at Barrett's farm studio in Gawcott, just off Aylesbury. This would later become Barrett's Place where a vast quantity of Otway/Barrett music was recorded. The album was also mixed here.

Promotion 

The promotion for the album began in 1975 when Transatlantic released Krazy Kong backed with Bus Shelter Reggae. The single was put out in both England and France, although the French pressing has "Special Reggae" printed on the front. Although the album wasn't released for another six years, a second single surfaced on publisher's label Logo Records again featuring Return of Kong (a version different from the track on the album), the b-side being a non-album track; Nice to Know You're My Friend.

Once the album was mixed, the leading single was advertised in the Otway & Barrett tour book of the time. To advertise the album, Barrett placed an ad in the Melody Maker also featuring two Eddie Stanton singles. Stanton later wrote several of the songs on Barrett's next album, Organic Bondage and The Wimp and The Wild's Focke Wolf. All of Red Eye/Black Eye's releases were distributed by Spartan Records, an affiliate of Cherry Red. The album retailed at £3.99.

Several tracks from the album have been released recently; five on Barrett's Anthology and the alternative Return of Kong on The Transatlantic Story

Track listing

Vinyl Label errors 
There are a number of errors printed on the label of the vinyl, namely track positions, writer credits and publishers
1 Written by Barrett 
2-5 written by Francis/Barrett 
 Crazy Cool
 Return Of Kong
 Bus Shelter Reggae
 Kong & The Soup Dragon
 I'm A Dog
1,5 Written by Barrett 
2 Written by Furber/Gay 
3 Traditional arranged by Barrett 
4 Written by Francis/Barrett
 One Leg Blues
 The Lambeth Trot
 Drink To Me Only With Thine Eyes
 Me And The Devil
 A Shot Of Red Eye

Personnel 

Wild Willy Barrett - vocals, guitar, violin, bass, banjo, keyboards, percussion
Adam Francis - guitar on "Me and the Devil"
Lol Coxhill - saxophone on "Krazy Kong"
Mark Freeman - drums on "A Shot of Red Eye"

The Krazy Songs

Legend
(s) = Single 
(a) = Album 
(d) = Demo 
(l) = Live 
(u) = Unreleased 
(TA) = Produced by Tony Atkins

References

Notes

1980 albums